Murray's smooth-head (Conocara murrayi), also called Murray's slickhead, is a species of fish in the family Alepocephalidae.

Description

Murray's smooth-head is black in colour. It is described as "moderately elongate, deep bodied, and posteriorly compressed, with a relatively long, acute snout", with scales along its length. It has a lateral line.

Habitat

Murray's smooth-head lives in the north Atlantic Ocean and Gulf of Mexico;

References

Alepocephalidae
Fish described in 1927
Taxa named by Einar Laurentius Koefoed